Kirk Wagoner also known as Kirk B. Wagoner is an American politician. He serves as a Republican member of the Montana House of Representatives, where he represents District 75, including Montana City, Montana, Clancy, Montana, Boulder, Montana, Whitehall, Montana.

References

Living people
People from Jefferson County, Montana
Republican Party members of the Montana House of Representatives
Year of birth missing (living people)